Military payment certificates, or MPC, were a form of currency used to pay U.S. military personnel in certain foreign countries. They were used in one area or another from a few months after the end of World War II until a few months after the end of U.S. participation in the Vietnam War – from 1946 until 1973. MPC utilized layers of line lithography to create colorful banknotes that could be produced cheaply. Fifteen series of MPCs were created.  However, only 13 series were issued.  The remaining two were largely destroyed, although some examples remain.  Among the 13 released series a total of 94 notes are recognized.

History of MPCs 
MPCs evolved from Allied Military Currency as a response to the large amounts of US Dollars circulated by American servicemen in post-World War II Europe. The local citizens might not trust local currencies, as the future of their governments was unclear. Preferring a stable currency like U.S. dollars, local civilians often accepted payment in dollars for less than the accepted conversion rates. Dollars became more favorable to hold, inflating the local currencies and thwarting plans to stabilize local economies. Contributing to this problem was the fact that troops were being paid in dollars, which they could convert in unlimited amounts to the local currency with  merchants at the floating (black market) conversion rate, which was much more favorable to the GIs than the government fixed conversion rate. From this conversion rate imbalance, a black market developed where the servicemen could profit from the more favorable exchange rate. 

To reduce profiteering from currency arbitrage, the U.S. military devised the MPC program. MPC were paper money initially denominated in amounts of 5¢, 10¢, 25¢, 50¢, $1, $5, and $10; a $20 note was added in 1968. Unlike US currency, these certificates were issued under the authority of the Department of War (later Department of Defense) rather than the Department of the Treasury. Consequently, they do not bear the US Treasury seal found on virtually every example of US civilian currency. MPCs were fully convertible to U.S. dollars upon leaving a designated MPC zone, and convertible to local currencies when going on leave (but not vice versa). It was illegal for unauthorized personnel to possess MPC, and that policy, in theory, eliminated U.S. dollars from local economies. Although actual greenbacks were not circulating, many local merchants accepted MPC on par with US dollars, since they could use them on the black market. This was especially evident during the Vietnam War when the MPC program was at its zenith. To prevent MPC from being used as a primary currency in the host country and destroying the local currency value and economy, MPC banknote styles were frequently changed to deter black marketers and reduce hoarding. A "conversion day" or "C-day" was the soldiers' only chance to trade in their old MPC for the new issue, after which the old MPC became worthless.

C-days in Vietnam were always classified, never pre-announced. On a C-day, soldiers would be restricted to base, preventing them from helping Vietnamese civilians—especially local bars, brothels, bar girls and other black market people—from converting old MPC to the newer version. Since Vietnamese were not allowed to convert the currency, they frequently lost savings by holding old MPC that lost all value after the C-day was completed. 

Thirteen series of MPC were issued between 1946 and 1973, with varied designs often compared to Monopoly money due to their colors. After the official end of U.S. participation in the Vietnam War in early 1973, the only place where MPC remained in use was South Korea. In autumn of 1973, a surprise C-day was held there, retiring MPC and substituting greenbacks. MPC was never again issued, and the concept lay dormant until the late 1990s, when it was revived somewhat in the form of the Eagle Cash stored value card system, used by U.S. armed forces in Bosnia, Kosovo, Djibouti, Iraq, and Afghanistan, as well as other non-combat zones on a limited basis.

Because MPC were not issued as formal obligations of the United States Treasury, they can no longer be redeemed for currency.

MPC in popular culture
A Korean War C-day is a key plot element of "Change Day," an episode from the sixth season of the television series M*A*S*H. Major Charles Emerson Winchester III schemes to purchase soon-to-be-worthless MPC from local farmers and merchants for cash at 10% of face value, then trade it in and pocket a 900% profit. His plan is foiled when Hawkeye Pierce and B.J. Hunnicutt arrange for the military police to set up a roadblock that delays him from reaching camp in time for the exchange.

In the Vietnam War novel The Short-Timers by Gustav Hasford, Marine Sergeant James T. "Joker" Davis encounters an officer who habitually plays Monopoly with one of his subordinates. The two use MPC in place of the game's standard play money and divide all listed rents and prices by 10 (e.g. paying $35 rent instead of $350 for landing on Oriental Avenue with a hotel).

In “Hard Stripe”, a 1989 episode of Tour of Duty, a Finance Corps lieutenant at Tan Son Nhut in 1968 spots a soldier in illegal possession of a five dollar treasury note and warns him to convert it to MPCs when the treasury office opens the next morning.

See also
Allied Military Currency — Currency used in recently-liberated or occupied territories during and after World War II
Banknotes of the British Armed Forces — Currency issued by the British Armed Forces from 1946 to 1972
Japanese military currency (1937–1945)

References

 Fred Schwan (1997) Military Payment Certificates.

External links 
 Vietnam era MPC
 South Viet Nam: Soul Alley
 MPC Central
 A gallery of United States Military Payment Certificates at Banknote Museum

United States military pay and benefits
Payment systems
Inflation
Monetary reform
Banknotes of military authorities